is a former Japanese Nippon Professional Baseball pitcher. He played for the Yomiuri Giants from 1985 to 1994 and the Osaka Kintetsu Buffaloes from 1995 to 2001. He won a career high 11 games in 1990.

External links
Career statistics and player information from Baseball-Reference

1965 births
Living people
Baseball people from Nagasaki Prefecture
Japanese baseball players
Yomiuri Giants players
Kintetsu Buffaloes players
Osaka Kintetsu Buffaloes players
Japanese baseball coaches
Nippon Professional Baseball coaches